The Mokrani Revolt was the most important local uprising against France in Algeria since the conquest in 1830.

The revolt broke out on March 16, 1871, with the uprising of more than 250 tribes, around a third of the population of the country.

Background

Cheikh Mokrani presentation 
Cheikh Mokrani (full name el-Hadj-Mohamed el-Mokrani) and his brother Boumezrag (full name Ahmed Bou-Mezrag) came from a noble family - the Ait Abbas dynasty (a branch of the Hafsids of Béjaïa), the Amokrane, rulers, since the sixteenth century of the Kalâa of Ait Abbas in the Bibans and of the Medjana region. In the 1830s, their father el-Hadj-Ahmed el-Mokrani (d. 1853), had chosen to form an alliance with the French : he allowed the Iron Gates expedition in 1839, becoming thus khalifa of the Medjana under the supervision of French authorities. This alliance quickly proved to be a subordination - a decree of 1845 abolished the khalifalik of Medjana so that when Mohamed succeeded his father, his title was no more than “” ( = chief commander), and was part of the administration of the Bureaux arabes. During the hardships of 1867, he gave his personal guarantee, at the request of the authorities, for important loans.

The context 
The background of the revolt is as important as the revolt itself. In 1830, French army took up Algiers. Since then, France colonized the country, setting up its own administration all over Algeria. Shortly after 1830, a resistance rose up, led by Abd al-Kader, which lasted till 1847. French administrations and the France government decided to repress this movement which impacted both people and agriculture. The late 1860s were hard for the people of Algeria: between 1866 and 1868 they lived through drought, exceptionally cold winters, an epidemic of cholera and an earthquake. More than 10% of the Kabyle population died during this period. Thus, at the end of the 1860s, Algeria was exhausted and the demography at its worst. To sum up all those events, on March 9, 1870, the French government decided to put a civilian regime in Algeria, which gave more advantages to French colonizers. In 1870, the creditors demanded to be repaid and the French authorities reneged on the loan on the pretext of the Franco-Prussian War, leaving Mohamed forced to pawn his own possessions.  On June 12, 1869, Marshall MacMahon, the Governor General, advised the French government that “the Kabyles will stay peaceful as long as they see no possibility of driving us out of their country.”

Under the French Second Republic, the country was governed by a Governor General and a large proportion was "military territory".  There were tensions between the French colonists and the army; the former favouring the abolition of the military territory as being too protective of the native Algerians. Eventually, on March 9, 1870, the Corps législatif passed a law which would end the military regime in Algeria. When Napoleon III fell and the Third French Republic was proclaimed, the Algerian question fell under the remit of the new Justice Minister, Adolphe Crémieux, and not, as previously, under the Minister of War. At the same time, Algeria was experiencing a period of anarchy.  The settlers, hostile to Napoleon III and strongly Republican, took advantage of the fall of the Second Empire to push forward their anti-military agenda.  Real authority devolved to town councils and local defence committees, and their pressure resulted in the Crémieux Decree.

Meanwhile, on September 1, 1870, the French army was defeated by the Prussian army in Sedan, and lost the French part of Alsace-Lorraine. The fact that France was at this time defeated by another country brought hope to Algerians. Indeed, the news of the French defeat on its border was spread thanks to the paper news. Then, Algerian protests began in public places, and in the South of Algeria, people committee were established to organized the revolt.

Revolt's origins

Algerians inhabitants and the Second Empire 
A number of causes have been suggested for the Mokrani revolt. There was a general dissatisfaction among Kabyle notables because of the steady erosion of their authority by the colonial authorities. At the same time, ordinary people were concerned about the imposition of civilian rule on March 9, 1870, which they interpreted as imposing domination by the settlers, with encroachments on their land and loss of autonomy.

The Cremieux decree 
The Cremieux Decree of October 24, 1870, which gave French nationality to Algerian Jews was possibly another cause of the unrest. However some historians view this as doubtful, pointing out that this story only started to spread after the revolt was over. This explanation of the revolt was particularly widespread among French antisemites. News of the insurrectionary Paris commune also played a part. Indeed, from March 18 until May 28, 1871, Paris was under the Commune, which was an autonomous commune administered under direct democracy principles. This Commune was also the hope to found a social and democratic Republic. Thus, the episode of the Paris Commune resonated in Algeria as a new possibility to take over the French administration established in Algeria.

Several months before the start of the insurrections, Kabyle village communities multiply gatherings of electing village assemblies ("tiǧmaʿīn", Arabic "ǧamāʿa") despite the colonial authorities having banned them from doing so. It must be emphasised that those "ǧamāʿa" were managing bodies to the population, therefore an obstacle to French policy . On social matters those assemblies would decide rules for the community. They were composed with a president "amin", a treasurer named a "ukil" and some men of the village elected to verify the members (patrilineage) or because they are really elder.

The first signs of actual revolt appeared in the mutiny of a squadron of the 3rd Regiment of Spahis in January 1871. The spahis (Muslim cavalry troopers in the French Army of Africa) refused to be sent to fight in metropolitan France, claiming that they were only required to serve in Algeria. This mutiny began in Moudjebeur, near Ksar Boukhari on January 20, 1871, spread to Aïn Guettar (in the region of modern Khemissa, near Souk Ahras) on January 23, 1871, and soon reached El Tarf and Bouhadjar.

Cheikh Mokrani's dissidence 
The mutiny at Aïn Guettar involved the mass desertion of several hundred men and the killing of several officers. It took on a particular significance for the Rezgui family, whose members maintained that France, recently defeated by the Prussians, was a spent force and that now was the time for a general uprising. The Hanenchas responded to this call, killing fourteen colonists in their territory; Souk Ahras was besieged from 26th to 28 January, before being relieved by a French column, who then put down the insurgency and condemned five men to death.

Mokrani submitted his resignation as bachagha in March 1871, but the army replied that only the civil government could now accept it. In reply, Mokrani wrote to General Augeraud, subdivisional commander at Sétif:

The revolt spreads 

The spahi mutiny was reignited after March 16, 1871, when Mokrani took charge of it. On March 16, Mokrani led six thousands men in an assault on Bordj Bou Arreridj. On April 8, French troops regained control of the Medjana plain. The same day, Si Aziz, son of Cheikh al-Haddad, head of the Rahmaniyya order, proclaimed a holy war in the market of Seddouk. Soon 150,000 Kabyles rose, as the revolt spread along the coast first, then into the mountains to the east of the Mitidja and as far as Constantine. It then spread to the Belezma mountains and linked with local insurrections all the way down to the Sahara desert. As they spread towards Algiers itself, the insurgents took  Lakhdaria (Palestro), 60 km east of the capital, on the 14th of April. By April, 250 tribes had risen, or nearly a third of Algeria's population.  One hundred thousand “mujahidin”, poorly armed and disorganised, were launching random raids and attacks.

French counterattack 
The military authorities brought in reinforcements for the Army of Africa; Admiral de Gueydon, who took over as Governor General on March 29, replacing Special Commissioner , mobilised 22,000 soldiers. Advancing from Palestro towards Algiers, the rebels were stopped at Boudouaou (Alma) on April 22, 1871, by colonel Alexandre Fourchault under the command of General Orphis Léon Lallemand; on May 5, Mohamed el-Mokrani died fighting at Oued Soufflat, halfway between Lakhdaria (Palestro) and Bouira in an encounter with the troops of General .

On 25 April, the Governor General declared a state of siege. Twenty columns of French troops marched on Dellys and Draâ El Mizan. Cheikh al-Haddad and his sons were captured on July 13, after the battle of Icheriden. The revolt only faded after the capture of Bou-Mezrag, Cheikh Mokrani's brother, on January 20, 1872.

Repression 

During the fighting, around 100 European civilians died, along with an unknown number of Algerian civilians. After fighting ceased, more than 200 Kabyles were interned and others deported to Cayenne and New Caledonia, where they were known as Algerians of the Pacific. Bou-Mezrag Mokrani was condemned to death by a court in Constantine on March 27, 1873.

The Kabylie region was subjected to a collective fine of 36 millions francs, and 450,000 hectares of land were confiscated and given to new settlers, many of whom were refugees from Alsace-Lorraine, especially in the region of Constantine. The repression and confiscations forced a lot of Kabyles to leave the country.

Chronology of battles

Judicial trial of rebel leaders
After the end of the hostilities of the insurrection of Cheikh Mokrani, the Algerian rebel leaders who were captured alive appeared before the Assize Court of Algiers on December 27, 1872, on a count of indictment and an act of accusation linked to the sacking of the French colonies, the assassinations, fires and looting which sparked heated debates on this extremely important affair.

Several criminal charges weighed on each of the offender who all, without exception, had taken part in the insurrection. The prosecution of the court made charges which weighed on each of the accused for the crimes alleged against these main leaders and leaders of the 1871 insurrection.

The list of these incarcerated rebel leaders is as follows:

A long list was then enumerated of the names of other subordinate rebel Algerian leaders and natives who participated in the Alma and Palestro massacres.

After reading the indictment, including the whole so-called Palestro affair, which lasted about an hour and a half, the president of the assize court urged the jurors to follow on the notebook that was given to them, and where the name of each offender was written at the top of a page, the individual examination which will be carried out and to take notes due to the length of the debates.

Deportation to New Caledonia

The leaders of the Mokrani Revolt after their capture and trial in 1873 were either executed, subjected to forced labor, or deported and exiled to the Pacific and New Caledonia.

A convoy of 40 Kabyle insurrectional leaders  was undertaken on the ship La Loire on June 5, 1874, towards the L'Île-des-Pins for deportation. They were the symbols of Algerian resistance against the French occupation.

The specialist in history Malika Ouennoughi drew up a list of these 40 deportees, whose names follow:

 Cheikh Boumerdassi, born in 1818 at Ouled Boumerdès, was a marabout, with the matricule: 1301.
 Ahmed ben Ali Seghir ben Mohamed Ouallal, born in 1854 at Baghlia, was a farmer, with the matricule: 852.
 Ahmed Kerbouchene, born in 1829 at Larbaâ Nath Irathen, was a farmer, with the matricule: 883.
 Ahmed ben Mohamed ben Barah, born in 1829 at Dar El Beïda, was a farmer, with the matricule: 859.
 Ahmed ben Belkacem ben Abdallah, born in 1822 at Oued Djer, was an indigene, with the matricule: 1306.
 Ahmed ben Ahmed Bokrari, born in 1838 at Bou Saâda, was an farmer, with the matricule: 857.
 Abdallah ben Ali ben Djebel, born in 1844 at Guelma, was a spahi, with the matricule: 803.
 Ahmed ben Salah ben Amar ben Belkacem, born in 1809 at Souk Ahras, was an caïd, with the matricule: 854.

They numbered 50 Algerian deportees, and were reinforced with 280 other French convicts from the jails of Fort Quélern, and at their head the marabout Cheikh Boumerdassi.

This ship arrived on June 7, at the anchorage of the port of Île-d'Aix, where it embarked 700 passengers, including 40 women, and 320 other French deportees.

On June 9, he left for Nouméa, and it was therefore the 9th convoy of deportees that left France to then stop on June 23, in Santa Cruz de Tenerife, to arrive in Nouméa on October 16, 1874.

After a last stopover in Santa Catarina Island,  La Loire arrives in Nouméa on October 16, 1874, after a journey of 133 days.

There will be around 5 deaths at sea and on November 10, of the same year, the ship "La Loire" left Nouméa to return to France after having disembarked the convicts from Kabylie.

On the 40 or 50 Algerians mentioned, 39 were destined for simple deportation to the L'Île-des-Pins, and only one of them for deportation to a fortified enclosure.

On the 300 convoys in the convoy, 250 suffered from scurvy, and will die in the weeks following their arrival in New Caledonia according to Roger Pérennès.

In Mémoires d'un Communard, Jean Allemane evokes a deadly epidemic of dysentery which decimated the transported people that La Loire had just landed, and who were buried in large numbers.

Begun at dawn, the burial of the corpses was a task which often did not end until nightfall, and the men who had died of dysentery presented a morbid spectacle.

More than two hundred convicts who had come by the Loire died almost immediately after their disembarkation.

However Louis-José Barbançon reports that on the civil status registers of the Bagne of L'Île-des-Pins, which were very well kept, only 28 deaths of convicts who came by "La Loire" appeared in the 6 months after arrival of the ship.

See also
List of participants in Mokrani Revolt
Zawiyas in Algeria
Rahmaniyya
Zawiyet Sidi Boumerdassi
Cheikh Boumerdassi
Fort Quélern
French ship Prince Jérôme

Bibliography 
Bozarslan, Hamit. Sociologie politique du Moyen-Orient, Collection Repères, La Découverte, 2011. 
Brett, Michael. “Algeria 1871–1954 - Histoire de l’Algérie Contemporaine. Vol. 11: De L’insurrection de 1871 Au Déclenchement de La Guerre de Libération (1954). By Charles-Robert Ageron. Paris: Presses Universitaires de France, 1979. Pp. 643. No Price Stated.” Journal of African history 22.3 (1981): 421–423. Web.
Brett, Michael. “Algeria 1871–1954.” The Journal of African History 1981: 421–423. 
De Grammont, H.-D. “RINN, Histoire de l’insurrection de 1871 en Algérie.” Revue Critique d’Histoire et de Littérature 25.2 (1891): 301–. Print.
De Peyerimhoff, Henri.  “La colonisation officielle en Algérie de 1871 à 1895.” Revue Économique Française 1928: 369–. Print.
De Peyerimhoff, Henri de, and Comité Bugeaud. La colonisation officielle de 1871 à 1895 : [rapport à M. Jonnart, gouverneur général de l’Algérie]. Paris Tunis: Société d’éditions géographiques, maritimes et coloniales Comité Bugeaud, 1928. Print.
Jalla, Bertrand. “L’autorité judiciaire dans la répression de de 1871 en Algérie.” Outre-mers (Saint-Denis) 88.332 (2001): 389–405. Web.
Merle, Isabelle . “Algérien en Nouvelle-Calédonie : Le destin calédonien du déporté Ahmed Ben Mezrag Ben Mokrani.” L’année du Maghreb 20 (2019): 263–281. Web.

Lewis, Bernard. Histoire du Moyen-Orient, Albin Michel, 2000.
Robin, Joseph, Mahé, Alain. L’insurrection de la Grande Kabylie en 1871. Saint-Denis: Éditions Bouchène, 2018. Print.
Sicard, Christian. La Kabylie en feu : Algérie 1871. Paris: Georges Sud, 2013. Print.

References 

1871 in Algeria
Resistance to the French colonial empire
Kabylie
Mokrani Revolt